Madagascar – United States relations are bilateral relations between Madagascar and the United States.

History

Relations between the United States and Madagascar date to the middle of the 19th century, when the United States was Madagascar's largest trade partner.  The two countries concluded a commercial convention in 1867 and a treaty of peace, friendship, and commerce in 1881.  At the time, Madagascar was largely controlled by the Merina Kingdom, based in the country's central highlands.  In 1886, the U.S. sent its first Commercial Agent to Madagascar (John P. Finkelmeier), and in 1875 its first Consul (William W. Robinson).  Both were based in the port of Tamatave (now Toamasina). 

In the years between the First Franco-Hova War and the annexation of Madagascar by France, a series of U.S. Consuls in the country supported the rights of the Merina government against French colonial claims, notably by receiving exequatur from the Merina rather than the French, as the French insisted they should.  This culminated in the 1895 arrest of former U.S. Consul John Louis Waller, who had been granted a large tract of land by the Merina government (who refused to make such grants to the French).  Waller was taken to metropolitan France and sentenced to 20 years in prison for allegedly conspiring with Merina radicals.  The incident was only resolved when U.S. President Grover Cleveland secured his release by threatening to sever diplomatic ties between the U.S. and France.  Additionally, in 1882-1883 a Malagasy diplomatic delegation visited the U.S. in order to gain support against French designs on the island.  They visited Washington D.C., Philadelphia, New York City, Boston, and Salem, addressing not only government officials but merchants who had substantial trade interests in Madagascar.

After France officially annexed Madagascar in 1896, French treaties with the U.S. superseded all previous treaties that the U.S. had signed with the Merina Kingdom.  In 1916, the U.S. relocated its consulate from the port of Tamatave to the highland capital Tananarive (Antananarivo).

The Malagasy Republic became independent from France on June 26, 1960, and the U.S. Consulate in Madagascar was upgraded to an Embassy on the same day.  The first Ambassador to Madagascar was accredited on October 5, 1960 (Frederic Pearson Bartlett).  On December 5, 1960, the Malagasy Embassy to the U.S. opened in Washington D.C., and the first Malagasy Ambassador to the U.S. was accredited (Louis Rakotomalala).  All U.S. treaties with France would remain in effect with Madagascar unless otherwise indicated.

In 1964 the U.S. constructed a NASA satellite tracking station in northwestern Madagascar (Majunga), which would later be moved to Antananarivo.  Also in that year, Malagasy President Philibert Tsiranana visited the U.S. on a two-week tour, and received an official state welcome on the White House South Lawn.

Traditionally warm relations suffered considerably following the 1972 and 1975 coups, when Madagascar expelled the U.S. ambassador, closed the NASA tracking station, pursued closer relationships with the USSR, Cuba, and North Korea, and nationalized two U.S. oil companies. In 1980, relations at the ambassadorial level were restored.

U.S. economic aid to Madagascar increased dramatically in the 1980s and 90s.  In 1984 USAID opened a field office in Madagascar.  In 1990, Madagascar was designated as a priority aid recipient, and assistance increased from $15 million in 1989 to $40 million in 1993.  Recent U.S. assistance has focused on census and family planning programs, conservation of Madagascar's remarkable biodiversity, private sector development, agriculture, democracy and governance initiatives; and media training.  A Peace Corps program was established on the island in 1992.  Madagascar qualified for AGOA trade benefits in 2000.  Madagascar became the first country with a Millennium Challenge Corporation compact when it signed an agreement worth $110 million in April 2005. The Ravalomanana government was especially positive about ties with the United States.

The fall of President Ravalomanana in 2009 and the subsequent Transition regime strained those relations. Madagascar could not benefit from much US or international aid any more, nor qualify for free trade agreements such as AGOA.

In 2013, a new president and a new national assembly were elected with the support of the international community. International aid resumed, and Madagascar was again eligible for AGOA trade benefits.  However, the damage to its main export industry (textiles) was already done. However, in June 2015, a new degradation of the political climate in Antananarivo prompted the U.S. State Department to voice its concern and call for a 'national dialogue' in the country.

In 2020 the Peace Corps suspended operations in Madagascar due to the COVID-19 pandemic. In August 2022, Peace Corps volunteers returned to Madagascar.

Resident diplomatic missions
 Madagascar has an embassy in Washington, D.C.
 United States has an embassy in Antananarivo.

See also
 Foreign relations of Madagascar
 Foreign relations of the United States

References 

L'Express de Madagascar (in French)

 
Bilateral relations of the United States
United States